The Divinity School is a medieval building and room in the Perpendicular style in Oxford, England, part of the University of Oxford. Built between 1427 and 1483, it is the oldest surviving purpose-built building for university use, specifically for lectures, oral exams and discussions on theology. It is no longer used for this purpose, although Oxford does offer degrees in Theology and Religion taught by its Faculty of Theology and Religion.

The ceiling consists of very elaborate lierne vaulting with bosses (455 of them), designed by William Orchard in the 1480s.

The building is physically attached to the Bodleian Library (with Duke Humfrey's Library on the first floor above it), and is opposite the Sheldonian Theatre where students matriculate and graduate. At the far end from the Bodleian Library entrance, a door leads to Convocation House (built 1634–7).

References

External links 

Buildings and structures completed in 1483
Buildings and structures of the University of Oxford
History of Oxford
Christianity in Oxford
Tourist attractions in Oxford
Individual rooms
Educational institutions established in the 15th century